
Suwałki County is a unit of territorial administration and local government (powiat) in Podlaskie Voivodeship, north-eastern Poland, on the Lithuanian border. It came into being on January 1, 1999, as a result of the Polish local government reforms passed in 1998. Its administrative seat is the city of Suwałki, although the city is not part of the county (it constitutes a separate city county); there are no towns within the county.

As of 2019 its total population is 35,689. It includes the protected area known as Suwałki Landscape Park.

Neighbouring counties
Apart from the city of Suwałki, Suwałki County is also bordered by Sejny County to the east, Augustów County to the south, Ełk County to the south-west, and Olecko County and Gołdap County to the west. It also borders Lithuania to the north.

Administrative division
The county is subdivided into nine gminas. These are listed in the following table, in descending order of population.

References

 
Populated places established in 1999
Suwalki
1999 establishments in Poland